Muthoni Gathecha  (born April 8, 1962) is a Kenyan actress. She has starred in several Kenyan television series.

Early life
Born April 8, 1962, Muthoni is a teacher and an education administrator at Kenyatta University. She trained as a psychologist in the United States International University.

Career
In 2013, she was one of the protagonists in Kenya's telenovela, Kona. She played together with an ensemble cast of Nini Wacera, Janet Sision, and Lwanda Jawar. She later returned to TV in 2014 when she starred in Pray and Prey as the villainous Margaret, an evil and overprotective mother. Her latest role was in the soap opera, Skandals kibao, in which she played the loving mother of two daughters. She shared credits with actresses like Avril and Janet Sision. She has appeared in films that are mainly produced under the Africa Magic Movie Franchise. They include Shortlist, Close Knit Group, Get Me a Job, The Black Wedding, The Next Dean, and I Do.

Personal life
Muthoni is a mother of three. Her first born is a rap artist and musician who goes by the stage name Mchizi Gaza. Her second child is Rowzah, a fashion designer. Her youngest is Mizen.

Filmography

References

External links

1962 births
Kenyan television actresses
Kenyan film actresses
Living people
21st-century Kenyan actresses